The Robert C. Byrd Green Bank Telescope (GBT) in Green Bank, West Virginia, US is the world's largest fully steerable radio telescope, surpassing the Effelsberg 100-m Radio Telescope in Germany. The Green Bank site was part of the National Radio Astronomy Observatory (NRAO) until September 30, 2016. Since October 1, 2016, the telescope has been operated by the independent Green Bank Observatory. The telescope's name honors the late Senator Robert C. Byrd who represented West Virginia and who pushed the funding of the telescope through Congress.

The Green Bank Telescope operates at meter to millimeter wavelengths. Its 100-meter diameter collecting area, unblocked aperture, and good surface accuracy provide superb sensitivity across the telescope's full 0.1–116 GHz operating range. The GBT is fully steerable, and 85 percent of the local celestial hemisphere is accessible.  It is used for astronomy about 6500 hours every year, with 2000–3000 hours per year going to high-frequency science.  Part of the scientific strength of the GBT is its flexibility and ease of use, allowing for rapid response to new scientific ideas. It is scheduled dynamically to match project needs to the available weather. The GBT is also readily reconfigured with new and experimental hardware.  The high-sensitivity mapping capability of the GBT makes it a vital complement to the Atacama Large Millimeter Array, the Expanded Very Large Array, the Very Long Baseline Array, and other high-angular resolution interferometers. Facilities of the Green Bank Observatory are also used for other scientific research, for many programs in education and public outreach, and for training students and teachers.

The telescope began regular science operations in 2001, making it one of the newest astronomical facilities of the US National Science Foundation (NSF). It was constructed following the collapse of a previous telescope at Green Bank, a 90.44 m paraboloid that began observations in October 1961. The previous telescope collapsed on 15 November 1988 due to the sudden loss of a gusset plate in the box girder assembly, which was a key component for the structural integrity of the telescope.

Location 

The telescope sits near the heart of the United States National Radio Quiet Zone, a unique area located in the town of Green Bank, West Virginia, where authorities limit all radio transmissions to avoid emissions toward the GBT and the Sugar Grove Station.  The location of the telescope within the Radio Quiet Zone allows for the detection of faint radio-frequency signals which man-made signals might otherwise mask. The observatory borders National Forest land, and the Allegheny Mountains shield it from some radio interference.

The telescope's location has been the site of important radio astronomy telescopes since 1957. It currently houses seven additional telescopes, and in spite of its somewhat remote location, receives about 40,000 visitors each year.

Description 
The panels are made from aluminum manufactured to a surface accuracy of better than  RMS. The actuators adjust the panel positions to compensate for sagging, or bending under its own weight, which changes as the telescope moves. Without this so-called "active surface" adjustment, observations at frequencies above 4 GHz would not be as efficient.

Unusual for a radio telescope, the primary reflector is an off-axis segment of a paraboloid. This is the same design used in familiar home satellite television (e.g., DirecTV) dishes. The asymmetric reflector allows the telescope's focal point and feed horn to be located at the side of the dish, so that it and its retractable support boom do not obstruct the incoming radio waves, as occurs in conventional radio telescope designs with the feed located on the telescope's beam axis.

The offset support arm houses a retractable prime focus feed horn in front of the 8 m subreflector and eight higher-frequency feeds on a rotating turret at the Gregorian focus. Operational frequencies range from 290 MHz to 115 GHz.

Because of its height (at 148 meters or 485 feet tall, it is 60% taller than the Statue of Liberty) and bulk (16 million pounds), locals sometimes refer to the GBT as the “Great Big Thing”.

Discoveries 

In 2002, astronomers detected three new millisecond pulsars in the globular cluster Messier 62.

In 2006, several discoveries were announced, including a large coil-shaped magnetic field in the Orion molecular cloud, and a large hydrogen gas superbubble 23,000 light years away, named the Ophiuchus Superbubble.

In 2019, the most massive neutron star PSR J0740+6620 to date was detected. Since 2004, 28 new complex molecules have been discovered in the interstellar medium with the Green Bank Telescope.

Funding threatened 
In response to limited budgetary issues, the Division of Astronomical Sciences (AST) of the National Science Foundation (NSF) commissioned a portfolio review committee, which conducted its work between September 2011 and August 2012. The committee, which reviewed all AST-supported facilities and activities, was composed of 17 external scientists and chaired by Daniel Eisenstein of Harvard University. As part of the committee's August 2012 recommendation  for the closure of six facilities, was that the Robert C. Byrd Green Bank Telescope (GBT) should be defunded over a five-year period.

In July 2014, the United States Senate Committee on Appropriations approved the NSF's fiscal year 2014 budget, which did not call for divestment of the GBT in that fiscal year. The facility then began looking for partners to help fund its $10 million annual operating costs.

On October 1, 2016, the National Radio Astronomy Observatory at Green Bank separated from the NSF and began accepting funding from private sources to stay operational as an independent institution, the Green Bank Observatory.

Relation to Breakthrough Listen 
The telescope is a key facility of the Breakthrough Listen project, in which it is used to scan for radio signals possibly emitted by extraterrestrial technologies. In late 2017, the telescope was used to scan ʻOumuamua for signs of extraterrestrial intelligence.

See also 
 Grote Reber
 List of astronomical observatories
 List of radio telescopes
 Project Ozma

References

External links
 
 

Astronomical observatories in West Virginia
Buildings and structures in Pocahontas County, West Virginia
Landmarks in West Virginia
Radio telescopes

de:Green-Bank-Observatorium